Karun Airlines (formerly Iranian Naft Airlines) is an airline based in Tehran, Iran. It operates cargo and passenger scheduled and charter services within Iran and to neighbouring regions. Its main bases are Tehran Mehrabad Airport and Ahvaz International Airport with secondary bases at Bandar Abbas International Airport and Isfahan International Airport.

History 
The airline was established and started operations in 1992. In 2004 it officially became known as Iranian Naft Airline. Owned and operated by the Retirement Organization of National Iranian Oil Company, it has more than 600 employees.

In September 2017, it was announced that the airline was to be renamed as Karun Airlines.

Destinations

Fleet

Current fleet
The Karun Airlines fleet consists of the following aircraft as of August 2019:

Former fleet
The airline previously operated the following aircraft:
 1 Boeing 737-300, leased from Khors Aircompany

See also
 List of airlines of Iran

References

External links

 Iranian Naft Airlines official website - unable to connect from UK 20150906
NaftAirline.com  - works from UK 20150906
Iranian Naft Airlines Fleet

Airlines of Iran
Airlines established in 1992
Iranian companies established in 1992